Tuomo & Markus is a Helsinki Finland based musical group founded by renowned Finnish soul artist and jazz musician Tuomo Prättälä and singer/songwriter Markus Nordenstreng from Finnish rock band The Latebirds. They occasionally perform and record under the alias Pratt & Moody.

Tuomo & Markus are known for their unique vocal blend. Their music has been described as indie folk and Nordic Americana. Their influences include The Band, Staple Singers, Grateful Dead, Crosby, Stills & Nash, Randy Newman, JJ Cale, Everly Brothers, Judee Sill, Curtis Mayfield & The Impressions, Sly Stone, Stevie Wonder and Bob Dylan. The band's sound has been compared to Simon & Garfunkel, Fleet Foxes, Wilco, Calexico and Wigwam

The two artists met in Helsinki in 2007 while performing in an all-star benefit show. After realizing they shared a common love for vocal harmonies and American roots music, Tuomo & Markus started periodically performing and writing together. The new songs led to recording sessions at Wavelab Recording Studio in Tucson Arizona. These sessions also featured various notable American musicians including Joey Burns, John Convertino and Jacob Valenzuela from Tucson-based Calexico, Wilco members John Stirratt and Pat Sansone as well as Gary Louris from the Jayhawks who also contributed one song on the album

Tuomo & Markus' debut album Dead Circles ended up taking almost four years to complete. The double album was finally released in Finland and the rest of Scandinavia in August 2016 as a vinyl only release (North American and European releases came out in 2018). Dead Circles was well received in Finland, earning favorable reviews in publications like Helsingin Sanomat and Yleisradio. The album also did relatively well commercially despite being a vinyl only release, making it to Finnish Top-20. Spotify curated the album's opening track Over The Rooftops to a popular internationally recognized playlist. The same track has been on constant rotation on stations like KEXP and KCRW. 

The band started working on their sophomore album Game Changing while touring in North America. Most of the tracks were recorded at Jonathan Wilson's studio in Los Angeles CA and Flowers Studio in Minneapolis MN with their full touring band. Jonathan Wilson was featured on several tracks, playing drums, bass, keyboards and lead guitar, along with guitarist Marc Ribot, folk musician Pekko Käppi and jazz trumpet virtuoso Verneri Pohjola. The liner notes for the album were written by journalist legend David Fricke who had earlier described the band's sound in Rolling Stone as “a marvelous debut steeped in the pioneer stories of The Band, the painted-desert psychedelia of the American Beauty-era Grateful Dead and the modernist extensions of Wilco and Tucson band Calexico”. 

The album's release was stalled because of the pandemic and vinyl production challenges. Game Changing was finally released worldwide on January 13, 2023, getting very favourable reviews internationally and hitting top 10 in Finland. 

Tuomo & Markus have composed and performed the soundscape for Finnair along with famous Finnish radio station Radio Helsinki and their music has been featured in various films and documentaries.

Tuomo & Markus live lineup includes steel guitar player Miikka 'McGyver' Paatelainen, drummer and trombone player Juho Viljanen and bass player Jere Ijäs. Since 2016 Tuomo & Markus has also featured distinguished Finnish jazz trumpet player Verneri Pohjola, the son of legendary bass player and Wigwam member Pekka Pohjola. Tuomo Prättälä has performed with Verneri Pohjola in the past in Finnish jazz group Ilmiliekki Quartet.

Tuomo & Markus have shared stages with many notable artists ranging from Neil Young to Wilco and The Jayhawks.

Members
Tuomo Prättälä – lead vocals, piano, keyboards
Markus Nordenstreng – lead vocals, guitars
Juho Viljanen – drums, trombone, percussion, backing vocals
Jere Ijäs – bass, backing vocals
Miikka 'McGyver' Paatelainen – pedal steel guitar, mandolin
Verneri Pohjola – trumpet

Discography
Dead EP (2016)
Dead Circles (2016)
Pratt & Moody – "Lost Lost Lost" 7" single (2017)
Pratt & Moody – "Words Words Words" 7" single (2018)
Pratt & Moody – "Wheels Turning" 7" single (2020)
Game Changing (2023)

References

Tuomo & Markus official website
The Latebirds homepage

Rolling Stone Magazine Fricke's Picks

Finnish musical groups